Divide by Zero is the second studio album by Killing Floor, released on September 23, 1997 by Re-Constriction Records.

Reception

AllMusic gave Divide by Zero a mixed to negative marker of two and a half out of five stars. Aiding & Abetting gave the album a positive review, saying "Killing Floor uses everything to its advantage: riffage, throbbing rhythms, shouted vocals and a wonderful touch in the studio." and "seamless sound is good, as before, and the songs are able to merge the lyric and musical ideas much better than on the debut." Larry Miles of Black Monday called the album typical of the industrial genre, "aggressive, guitar driven and apocalyptic", while highlighting the band for "mixing an aggressive message with bone crushing punk tendencies." Fabryka Music Magazine gave the album four out of four and praised the mysterious cold wave atmosphere in compositions such as "Unity" as being the highlight of the album. Sonic Boom praised the band for their production quality and artistic growth, saying "ultimately fans of previous Killing Floor material will definitely enjoy this album while the musical diversity will cater to a much wider audience than before."

Track listing

Personnel 
Adapted from the Divide by Zero liner notes.

Killing Floor
 James Basore – drums, drum programming, tape, backing vocals, production, engineering, mixing, editing
 John Belew – sampler, synthesizer, programming, production, engineering, mixing, editing, design
 Marc Phillips – electric guitar, bass guitar, production, engineering, mixing, editing
 Karl Tellefsen – electric guitar, bass guitar, backing vocals, production, engineering, mixing, editing
 Christian Void – lead vocals, sampler, electronics, trumpet, production, engineering, mixing, editing

Production and additional personnel
 Matt Boudreau – mixing
 Walter Dahn – cover art
 Arjan McNamara – mastering, engineering and mixing (3) 
 Matt Murman – mastering
 Josh Tobias Roberts – production, recording, engineering, mixing

Release history

References

External links 
 

1997 albums
Killing Floor (American band) albums
Re-Constriction Records albums